Henryk Wars (born Henryk Warszawski, after 1947 Henry Vars; 29 December 1902 – 1 September 1977) was a Polish composer. He composed scores for 50 films during the interwar period in Poland and 60 more in the United States.

He composed dozens of hits for revue-theatres and films including Miłość ci wszystko wybaczy (Love Will Forgive You Everything) sung by Hanka Ordonówna, Umówiłem się z nią na dziewiątą (I Have a Date with Her at Nine) and Sex Appeal sung by Eugeniusz Bodo, Ach, jak przyjemnie (Ah, How Lovely!) and Już nie zapomnisz mnie (Now, You Will Remember Me) sung by Aleksander Żabczyński.

Wars also composed a symphony, now obscure though available on the Internet, as is his Piano Concerto of 1948. After emigrating to the United States in 1947, he changed his name to Henry Vars. He was a friend of John Wayne.

Biography 
Wars was born to a Jewish musical family in the Russian partition of Poland. He began studies at the Academy of Fine Arts, but soon obtained a scholarship to the Music Conservatory in Warsaw, from which he graduated in 1925, having studied composition with Professor Roman Statkowski and Emil Młynarski. He was a long-time music director for Syrena Rekord. In 1927 he composed a song called New York Times ("I do nothing all day but read the New York Times") that was sung in the Karuzela (Merry-Go-Round) Theatre by Tadeusz Olsza and recorded by Henryk Gold's Orchestra for Syrena Rekord. His first big hit, though, was Zatańczmy tango (Let's Dance a Tango), composed in 1928 for Stanisława Nowicka and Eugeniusz Bodo. He was hired as a pianist for the Morskie Oko theater and joined Henryk Gold's band.

During the 1930s, he composed songs for a string of musical comedies in Poland, and his importance there is comparable to that of Irving Berlin in America.  His melodies from this period (along with those of Jerzy Petersburski and Zygmunt Wiehler) are still quite popular in Poland to this day, with his most popular songs often associated with pre-war Lwów. Recent recordings include Ach, śpij kochanie (Ah, Sleep My Darling) by Grzegorz Turnau and others, as well as many performances of Tylko we Lwowie. In 2002, the song Umówiłem się z nią na dziewiątą (I have a date with her at nine) appeared in The Pianist directed by Roman Polański.

He composed his first film score for Na Sybir in 1930, after gaining fame as a conductor and performer at various Warsaw cabarets and theaters including Morskie Oko, Hollywood, and Wielka Rewia. He composed scores for Paweł i Gaweł, Szpieg w masce (A Masked Spy), Piętro wyżej (Upstairs), and Zapomniana melodia (A Forgotten Tune) films. "He was the pioneer of swing music in Poland."

Shortly before the outbreak of World War II, he was drafted into the Polish Army and served in the defense of Poland in 1939. He was taken prisoner of war by the German army but managed to escape from a stopped train. He organized the big band Tea-Jazz in Soviet-occupied Lwów in 1940. He composed his first symphony at this time. In late 1941, he and his musicians joined the Polish II Corps of General Anders as part of the Polska Parada cabaret. After being demobilized from the army in 1947, he emigrated to the US.

In the US, he changed his name to Henry Vars and after a period of struggling and poverty, managed to resume his musical career. He was John Wayne's friend. His songs were sung by such well-known stars as Margaret Whiting, Bing Crosby, Doris Day, Brenda Lee and Dinah Shore. He composed the score and the title song for the Flipper movie and television series, as well as Daktari. He also composed score for the 1956 western film Gun the Man Down.

Concert Music 

 Symphony No. 1 (1949) 
 Piano Concerto (1950)
 City Sketches (1951)

Songs

Pre-World War II songs 
 A mnie w to graj (words by Jerzy Jurandot, movie Bolek i Lolek, sung by Adolf Dymsza)
 A u mnie siup, a u mnie cyk (words by Emanuel Szlechter, sung by Adolf Dymsza)
 Ach, jak przyjemnie (words by Ludwik Starski, movie Zapomniana melodia from 1938, sung by Adam Aston, later by Irena Santor)
 Ach, śpij kochanie (words by Ludwik Starski, movie Paweł i Gaweł from 1938, sung by Eugeniusz Bodo and Adolf Dymsza)
 Będzie lepiej (words by Emanuel Szlechter, movie Będzie lepiej from 1936)
 Co ja zrobię, że mnie się podobasz? (words by Jerzy Jurandot, movie Papa się żeni, 1936, sung by Zbigniew Rakowiecki and Lidia Wysocka)
 Dobranoc, oczka zmruż (words by Emanuel Szlechter, movie Włóczęgi from 1939, sung by Szczepko and Tońko, also known as Kołysanka Tońka)
 Ewelina (words by Jerzy Jurandot, movie Papa się żeni, 1936, sung by Mira Zimińska)
 Jak pani się ten pan podoba (words by Andrzej Włast, sung by Krystyna Paczewska)
 Jak za dawnych lat (words by Andrzej Włast or Jerzy Jurandot, sung by Stefan Witas)
 Już nie mogę dłużej kryć (words by Jerzy Jurandot, movie Pani minister tańczy from 1937, sung by Tola Mankiewiczówna and Aleksander Żabczyński)
 Już nie zapomnisz mnie (words by Ludwik Starski, movie Zapomniana melodia from 1938, sung by Aleksander Żabczyński)
 Już taki jestem zimny drań (words by Jerzy Nel and Ludwik Starski, movie Pieśniarz Warszawy from 1934, sung by Eugeniusz Bodo)
 Kocha, lubi, szanuje (words by Konrad Tom, Emanuel Szlechter, movie Kocha, lubi, szanuje, sung by Mieczysław Fogg, later by Irena Santor)
 Kocham (words by J. Roland, movie Bezimienni bohaterowie from 1931)
 Maleńka Jenny (words by J. Roland, movie: Głos pustyni from 1932, sung by Mieczysław Fogg)
 Miłość ci wszystko wybaczy (words by Julian Tuwim, movie Szpieg w masce from 1933, sung by Hanka Ordonówna)
 My dwaj, obacwaj (words by Emanuel Szlechter, movie Będzie lepiej from 1936, sung by Szczepko and Tońko)
 Na cześć młodości (words by Ludwik Starski, movie Sportowiec mimo woli from 1939)
 Na pierwszy znak (words by Julian Tuwim, movie Szpieg w masce from 1933, sung by Hanka Ordonówna)
 New York Times (from 1928, sung by Tadeusz Olsza and Eugeniusz Koszutski)
 Nic o Tobie nie wiem (words by Konrad Tom and Emanuel Szlechter, movie Włóczęgi from 1939, sung by Andrzej Bogucki and Zbyszko Runowiecki)
 Nic takiego (words by Marian Hemar, movie ABC miłości from 1935, sung by Kazimierz Krukowski and Adolf Dymsza)
 O, Key (words by Konrad Tom and Emanuel Szlechter, movie Czy Lucyna to dziewczyna from 1934, sung by Eugeniusz Bodo and Jadwiga Smosarska)
 On nie powróci już (words by Andrzej Włast, sung by Chór Dana)
 Panie Janie w stylu jazz (words by Ludwik Starski, movie Zapomniana melodia from 1938)
 Piosenka o zagubionym sercu (words by A. M. Świniarski, movie Pan minister i dessous, sung by Hanka Ordonówna)
 Płomienne serca (words by Marian Hemar, movie Na Sybir from 1930, sung by Tadeusz Faliszewski)
 Reformy pani minister (words by Jerzy Jurandot, movie Pani minister tańczy from 1937, sung by Tola Mankiewiczówna)
 Serce Batiara (words by Emanuel Szlechter, movie Serce Batiara for 1939 release, but all copies lost)
 Sexapil (words by Emanuel Szlechter, movie Piętro wyżej from 1937, sung by Eugeniusz Bodo)
 Szczęście raz się uśmiecha (words by Julian Tuwim, movie Pan minister i dessous, sung by Hanka Ordonówna)
 Tak cudnie mi (words by Jerzy Jurandot, movie Pani minister tańczy from 1937, sung by Tola Mankiewiczówna and Aleksander Żabczyński)
 Tyle miłości (words by Konrad Tom, movie Jego ekscelencja subiekt from 1933, sung by Eugeniusz Bodo)
 Tylko Ty (words by Aleksander Jellyn)
 Tylko we Lwowie (words by Emanuel Szlechter, movie Włóczęgi from 1939, sung by Szczepcio and Tońko)
 Tylko z Tobą i dla Ciebie (words by Ludwik Starski and Jerzy Nel, movie Pieśniarz Warszawy from 1934, sung by Eugeniusz Bodo)
 Umówiłem się z nią na dziewiątą (words by Emanuel Szlechter, movie Piętro wyżej from 1937, sung by Eugeniusz Bodo)
 W hawajską noc (words by Konrad Tom and Emanuel Szlechter, movie Czarna perła, sung by Eugeniusz Bodo and later by Irena Santor)
 Zakochany złodziej (words by Emanuel Szlechter and Ludwik Starski)
 Zapomnisz o mnie (words by Andrzej Włast, sung by Tadeusz Faliszewski)
 Zatańczmy tango (words by Andrzej Włast)
 Złociste włoski (words by Konrad Tom, movie Jego ekscelencja subiekt from 1933, sung by Eugeniusz Bodo)
 Zrób to tak (words by Ludwik Starski and Jerzy Nel, movie Pieśniarz Warszawy, sung by Eugeniusz Bodo)

Wartime songs 
From Piosenki z plecaka Helenki. See external link below.

 Polacy, do broni
 Może dzień ... może rok
 Po mlecznej drodze
 Ochotniczki
 Malowane usta
 Za pięć dwunasta
 Gdzie najlepiej
 Ochotniczka Helenka

Selected filmography (soundtrack)
 Exile to Siberia (1930)
Jego ekscelencja subiekt (1933)
Pieśniarz Warszawy (1934)
ABC miłości (1935)Będzie lepiej (1936)Bolek i Lolek (1936)Papa się żeni (1936)Znachor (1937)Robert and Bertram (1938)Ostatnia brygada (1938)Włóczęgi (1939)Wielka droga (1946)Chained for Life (1951)The Big Heat (1953)Seven Men From Now (1956)The Unearthly (1957)China Doll (1958)The Little Shepherd of Kingdom Come (1961)Battle at Bloody Beach (1961)House of the Damned (1963)Flipper (1963)Flipper's New Adventure (1964)Fools' Parade (1971)

References

 External links 
 
  lyrics by Emanuel Schlechter, sung by Tadeusz Olsza
 Lwowskie Piosenki, Lyrics in Polish with Lwów accent for Dobranoc, oczka zmruż, Serce batiara, My dwaj, obacwaj, and Tylko we Lwowie. Any actual performance may vary significantly from these words.
 Piosenki z plecaka Helenki, book by Feliks Konarski (alias REF-REN), Rome, 1946; in Polish.
 "Film Scores of Henry Vars in the United States: An Overview" by Linda Schubert in Polish Music Journal'', Vol. 4, No. 1.
 Szwajcarski paszport na Sybir, "Swiss passport to Siberia" by Diana Poskuta-Włodek in Nowy Dziennik, New York, 23 July 2004; in Polish.
 Polish Tangos: The Unique Inter-War Soundtrack to Poland’s Independence
 When Henryk Wars took on Hollywood

Polish composers
Polish film score composers
Male film score composers
American male composers
Musicians from Warsaw
20th-century Polish Jews
1902 births
1977 deaths
Polish military personnel of World War II
Polish prisoners of war
World War II prisoners of war held by Germany
Escapees from German detention
Polish cabaret performers
Polish emigrants to the United States
20th-century American composers
20th-century comedians
20th-century American male musicians